Shchyuchye is a rural locality (a selo) and the administrative center of Shchyuchinskoye Rural Settlement, Liskinsky District, Voronezh Oblast, Russia. The population was 1,029 as of 2010. There are 11 streets.

Geography 
Shchyuchye is located 32 km southeast of Liski (the district's administrative centre) by road. Pereyezheye is the nearest rural locality.

References 

Rural localities in Liskinsky District